Surendra Reddy (born 10 October 1931) was member of 3rd Lok Sabha from Mahabubabad in Andhra Pradesh State, India.

He was elected to 4th, 9th and 10th Lok Sabha from Warangal.

Personal life
Reddy married Jayamala Reddy on 28th November 1956. They had one son and two daughters. Vinayak Reddy, Surendra Reddy's grandson, married Aashritha Daggubati, Daggubati Venkatesh's elder daughter.

Political career
Join Indian National Congress and become the  Loka sabha member in 1965 from Mahabubabad constituency and re-elected in 1967 from Warangal constituency. In 1978 elected to Andhra Pradesh assembly from Dornakal and re-elected in 1983, 185 from same constituency. Two time elected as Loka sabha member from Warangal in 1989 and 1991.

References

1931 births
People from Khammam district
India MPs 1967–1970
India MPs 1962–1967
India MPs 1989–1991
India MPs 1991–1996
Andhra Pradesh politicians
Lok Sabha members from Andhra Pradesh
Living people
Indian National Congress politicians from Andhra Pradesh